The WWC Dominican Republic Heavyweight Championship was a short-lived title in the World Wrestling Council like the WWC Hardcore Championship this title debuted and became inactive in 2001.

Title history

Combined reigns

References
 wrestlingdata.com

World Wrestling Council championships
Heavyweight wrestling championships
Regional professional wrestling championships